Cribella is a genus of bryozoans in the family Bitectiporidae.

See also 
 List of prehistoric bryozoan genera
 Cribella elegans Schmidt, 1862, a synonym of Crella elegans (sponge)

References 

Bryozoan genera
Cheilostomatida